The PFA Scotland Young Player of the Year, formerly known as the Scottish PFA Young Player of the Year, is named at the end of every Scottish football season. The members of the Professional Footballers' Association Scotland vote on which of its young members played the best football in the previous year. The award was first given in 1978, to Graeme Payne. The Bulgarian international Stiliyan Petrov was the first non-Scottish player to win the award, when he did so in 2001.

List of winners 

As of 2022, the award has been presented 44 times and won by 39 different players. Kieran Tierney (3), Craig Levein (2), Eoin Jess (2) and Phil O'Donnell (2) are the players who have won the award more than once.

Breakdown of winners

Winners by club

Winners by country

See also
 PFA Scotland Players' Player of the Year
 PFA Scotland Team of the Year
 PFA Scotland Manager of the Year
 SFWA Young Player of the Year

References

Scottish football trophies and awards
Awards established in 1978
Footballers in Scotland
Association football player non-biographical articles
1978 establishments in Scotland